The Volkswagen Gol is a subcompact car that has been manufactured by Volkswagen do Brasil since 1980 as Volkswagen's entry-level car in the Latin American market—where it succeeded the Volkswagen Type 1 (Fusca) and the Volkswagen Brasilia. Several variants of the Gol-drived Voyage and Parati were marketed in North America as the Volkswagen Fox from 1987 to 1993.

The Gol has been produced in several versions, such as three- and five-door hatchbacks, four-door sedans (the Volkswagen Voyage), three- and five-door station wagons (the Volkswagen Parati), and two-door coupé utilities (the Volkswagen Saveiro).

The Gol was the best-selling car in Brazil for 27 consecutive years, from 1987 to 2014, and has been the most popular car in Argentina since 1988; approximately five million Gols have been manufactured in South America since 1980. In March 2013 it was announced that cumulative production of the Gol and its derivatives (Voyage, Saveiro, Parati) had reached 10 million units. It takes its name from the Portuguese (and Spanish) word for goal in football, taking advantage of the Brazilians' passion for football.

Body styles
The Gol family contains several body styles. The three- and five-door hatchback variants are known as the Volkswagen Gol in most markets, with the exception of Egypt and Russia, where they are marketed as the Volkswagen Pointer. The first-generation Gol was available only as a three-door hatchback; all generations since have offered a five-door variant as well.

The sedan has only been produced for the first and third (current) generations. The Brazilian-built sedans were marketed as the Volkswagen Voyage, while the Argentinian ones were referred to as the Volkswagen Gacel. In the United States and Canada, they were sold as the Volkswagen Fox. After a facelift in 1991, Argentinian-built models were renamed the Volkswagen Senda. In the second generation this model was replaced by the Volkswagen Polo Mk3 Classic, which was still sold in Mexico and Argentina. But a new Voyage notchback sedan returned in 2008 for the third generation.

Volkswagen Parati is a station wagon built on both generations since May 1982. The Parati I was a three-door sold in North America as the Fox Wagon. The second-generation Parati is sold in Argentina as the Gol Country. A five-door version was added in 1997 and the three-door version was dropped after the first facelift (G3). It is named after Paraty, a city on the southern coast of Rio de Janeiro state. It was formerly called Pointer Station Wagon in Mexico and it was sold there between 1999 and 2005. In 2013, The Parati was discontinued alongside the Gol G4 and was replaced by the SpaceFox.

Volkswagen Saveiro is a lightweight pickup truck. All Gol generations have been sold with this bodystyle, which was introduced to the market in 1983. It is named after a traditional Brazilian fishing boat. It is currently sold in Mexico since 1999 as the Pointer Pick Up.

First generation (Typ 30, 1980) 

The Gol was released in 1980 to replace the Brasilia, which was in turn a replacement for the Beetle on the Brazilian market. It was based on its own unique BX platform derived from the existing VW/Audi B1 and B2 platforms. With a design specific to Latin America, the Gol featured the 1.3-liter air-cooled, flat-four engine from the Beetle, but front-mounted. A 1.6-liter engine was added later. The Voyage two-door sedan variant of the Gol was released in June 1981 and received a 1.5-liter inline water-cooled gasoline engine instead. The same engine was offered with an ethanol option. In 1985, the air-cooled engine of the Gol was replaced by a 1.6-liter (and later 1.8-liter as well) longitudinally-mounted water-cooled gasoline inline-four engine from the Passat. By May 1982 the Voyage 1.5 was upgraded to 1.6. In 1984 a water-cooled Voyage 1.8 ("Super") was launched as a higher-level option. A 1.6-liter diesel engine was made, although only for export as diesel engines are not allowed in passenger cars in the Brazilian market.

In January 1983 a four-door Voyage sedan was released. It was known as the VW Amazon in some export markets, later as the Fox in North America. The four-door Voyage was built in the Autolatina Pacheco factory in Buenos Aires, Argentina from 1983 to 1994. It was sold under the name Gacel (later also as the Senda) with the Argentine-built 1.6 OHC engine with a carburettor, later also with a diesel 1.6.

The first generation (or "G1") Gol had two mild facelifts for 1987 and 1991. The 1989 Gol GTi was the first Brazilian-built car to use fuel injection. The 2.0-liter inline-four engine was the same used by the Santana. In 1991, as a result of changes to the tax laws in Brazil, a flurry of cars with engines under one liters appeared. Fiat was first (with the Fiat Mille), and Volkswagen quickly responded with the spartan Gol 1000. Between 1990 and 1995 the Ford CHT 1.6 replaced the original 1.6 in the range, also as a result of the Autolatina lineup.

Sports versions

GT 1.8 (1984–1986)
The Gol GT 1.8 was the BX family's first sports version and an answer to the Ford Escort XR3, a successful sports car in Brazilian market. With a 1.8 liter engine borrowed from Santana (MkII Passat), the Gol GT was much faster than the Escort XR3, but externally did not have the same beauty. The first series still had a four-speed manual gearbox, but soon this was changed to a five-speed unit.

GTS 1.8 (1987–1994)
Successor of Gol GT, the GTS had an updated design, following the new 87 BX line up style and also featuring new accessories that were not available before, such as rear spoiler and side skirts. The 1.8 liter engine produced  running on gasoline or  running on ethanol. The GTS was a very successful model and was kept in production alongside the upcoming GTI.

GTI 2000 (1989–1994)
Known as the first Brazilian built car equipped with electronic fuel injection, the Gol GTI was presented in January 1989 and featured a larger 2.0 liter engine with power of  running only on gasoline. This engine was the same as used in the larger Santana, albeit fitted with fuel injection for the GTI.

North America

Volkswagen Group of America marketed variants of the Gol (manufactured by Volkswagen do Brasil) in North America as entry level models from February 1987 until 1994 under the Volkswagen Fox nameplate. It was intended to provide Volkswagen dealers with a competitor to the then very successful Hyundai Excel and Yugo low-price cars. Initially offered as a two-door and four-door sedan as well as a two-door wagon, the wagon was discontinued for model year 1991 along with the two-door sedan for the Canadian market. That same year the remaining Fox versions received a mild restyling.

Early models (1987–1989) featured Bosch CIS-E type Jetronic electro-mechanical fuel injection, using an oxygen sensor to assist in fuel management. Later models (1990–1994) employed Bosch Digifant electronic fuel injection. In Canada from 1987–1989 it was offered with the simpler Bosch CIS fuel injection system without an oxygen sensor for the engine fuel management system.

Over the course of its model history, trim levels included base Fox, GL, GTS, GLS, GL Sport, Polo, and a Wolfsburg Edition. Options included air conditioning, five-speed (vs. four) manual transmission and metallic paint. No automatic transmission was offered. The GL trim featured revised cloth trim, rear license plate backing, ceiling-mounted map light, glove compartment light, trunk light, tachometer (excepting wagon models), body-colored bumpers, hubcaps, passenger side exterior rear view mirror, 175/70-13 tires, locking gas cap and three-point rear seat belts.

The 1991 facelift included revised grille, headlights, turn signals, badges, and hubcaps, as well as reduction of towing hooks from four to two. Later US models featured "automatic" non-motorized front seat shoulder belts along with a knee-bar and manual front lap belts, while the Canadian models have kept the manual pillar-mounted front seats.

Second generation (Typ 37/5X/5W, 1994) 

The second generation (or "G2") Gol, known as Project AB9 during development, debuted in September 1994. It was still based on the BX platform, and is very different from the earlier model, with an updated body and longer wheelbase than the 1980 original. Nicknamed "Gol Bolinha" (roughly "Rounded Gol" or "Bubble Gol"), the previous generation started to be nicknamed as "Gol Quadrado", "Squared Gol". The new version was an answer to the then newly released Chevrolet Corsa.

The Gol G2 was available in the following versions: 1000i, 1000i Plus, CL, GL, Furgão (Wagon) and GTi (this was fitted with an 8-valve engine until 1996, when a more powerful, German-built 16-valve version replaced it), with 1.0, 1.6, 1.8, and 2.0 liter engines. The 1.0 was supplied by Ford, as part of the AutoLatina collaboration. The Gol G2 also had two special editions. The first, "Gol Rolling Stones", was in 1995 - commemorating that band's "Voodoo Lounge Tour" leg in Brazil. Then, the following year came "Gol Atlanta" (after the Olympic Games). In November 1996, Volkswagen began to produce its own 1.0 engine, called the AT-1000. This version was derived from their larger 1.6 (999 cc).

As the Ford-built engine had been in limited supply, Volkswagen could now ramp up production of their entry level Gols beginning in January 1997. There were also 16 valve versions of the 1.0 AT-1000 engine launched in September 1996. In 1995 the Autolatina partnership was dissolved. In 1998, a 1.9 liter diesel engine was installed in the Gol G2, only sold in markets outside of Brazil.

Also this version of Gol had some chronic deficiencies of design, such as bad alignment of body parts, due to problems with the robots on the assembly line, and poor quality of plastic parts. A curious fact about this version of Gol is that the driver's seat is not well aligned with the steering wheel and pedals, causing a rather uncomfortable driving position. Another surprise was Volkswagen's original decision to sell the Gol and Parati (station wagon) only in three-door version, a step which was not appreciated by buyers. Fiat took the top spot in the Brazilian market for the last months of 1997, but once Volkswagen released quickly developed five-door models the Gol and Parati propelled Volkswagen back into first place in early 1998.

G3 and G4 facelifts

The second-generation Gol received two facelifts, which include both cosmetic and engine upgrades.

The first upgrade, in 1999 for 2000 model, was known as the Gol G3 (photo) in Brazil and had a new VW 'corporate' front end similar to the Jetta/Bora IV. The Gol G3 came with optional airbags and ABS brakes. The previous (G2) Gol 1.0 continued to be available as the "Gol Special", to fight for the lowest end of the market. Following the Mercosur economic crisis beginning with the Brazilian devaluation in 1999, the lineup was reduced in 2002. The 2.0 16V was discontinued, while the 1.8 was withdrawn from some markets. Argentinian production of the Gol was halted in 2003. Instead the engines at the bottom of the lineup were improved, with a 1.0 16V Turbo with a  1.0-liter turbocharged gasoline engine released in 2000.

When the 2005 (G4) Gol was released with styling cues from the Volkswagen Fox, incorporating the "V Grill", most avid automotive enthusiasts were unimpressed with the leap backwards in interior design. The G4 stayed in production until 2013, and was finally discontinued in 2015.

Gol Total Flex

The flexible fuel vehicle Gol Total Flex, available since 2003, was the first of its kind in South America. Its introduction followed a rehabilitation of the use of alcohol to power automobiles.

Pointer (Mexico)

The Gol G2 was introduced in Mexico in spring 1998 as the Volkswagen Pointer (a name previously used in Latin America for a rebadged model based on the Ford Escort Mk V, the Pointer/Logus). The only version for this year was a three-door hatchback with a 1.8 liter,  engine and a five-speed manual gearbox. The only extra cost option available was a package compounding air conditioning and power steering. For 1999, a five-door wagon version, the Brazilian Parati (called the Pointer Station Wagon in Mexico) and the Saveiro (called the Pointer Pick Up) are added. They were marketed in three trim levels: Base, Comfort (A/C and power steering) and Luxe (14" alloy wheels, power windows and remote control centralized door locks, A/C and power steering). For 2000 the Pointer received the same facelift as in Brazil and a sporty Pointer GTI based on the Brazilian Gol GTI is introduced. It was a three-door hatchback with a 2.0 liter,  engine. It had AM/FM/Cassette radio, alloy wheels, all around disc brakes, and sporty black seats as standard equipment. In 2002 a basic Pointer City version is introduced, the former Comfort version is renamed the Trendline, and the Luxe variant as the Comfortline. In 2005 the Pointer Station Wagon and the Pointer GTI are discontinued and the former Pointer trims (but the City) are replaced by a new Pointer Mi version.

In the model year 2007, the Pointer receives the newest facelift, and its versions are reorganized. The Pointer is currently marketed as the Base, A/C (Air Conditioning, power steering and rear wiper/washer), Trendline (Radio AM/FM Stereo CD, 15" alloy wheels, fog lamps), and GT (only available as a five-door hatchback. It has the same equipment as the Trendline plus: rear headrests, 6 spoke 15" alloy wheels, black accented headlamps, rear spoiler, and sport seats). The Pointer was replaced in December 2008 by the new Volkswagen Gol G5 which has been launched in Brazil in July 2008.

Gol around the world
As a result of a joint-venture with Kerman Khodro, the Gol has been built in Iran since 2003.

The Gol G3 was briefly sold in Russia in 2004-2006 as the Pointer, but the sales were soon discontinued due to low demand. The car was available with the 1.0-liter and the 1.8-liter engines.

The Gol G3 was also made and sold by Shanghai Volkswagen in China from February 2003 until 2008

It has also been sold in Egypt as the Volkswagen Pointer.

In Taiwan it was sold as Volkswagen Pointer, with only pick-up variant available.

Third generation (Typ 5U, 2008) 

The third generation of the Gol was released in Brazil, on 29 June 2008, as a 2009 model. Referred to before its launch as the Gol NF for Nachfolger or Neue Familie (German terms for "successor" and "new family" respectively), this model is marketed as the "Novo Gol". However, it is no longer based on the BX platform, but shares Volkswagen's PQ24 platform with the Fox and Polo, with some components from the PQ25 platform.

In Brazil, it was released in three and five-door hatchback version with the options of 1.0-liter or 1.6-liter flex engines. Its dimensions are 3.90 m in length, 1.66 m in width, 1.45 m in height with a wheelbase of 2.47 m, and luggage capacity of 285 liters. It is the first Gol to be offered with an automated manual transmission.

The advertisements were filmed in Los Angeles, California, featuring Sylvester Stallone and Gisele Bündchen.

Volkswagen High Torque (VHT) technology was introduced on the third generation Gol family. This new technology allows the flex engine to get the high torques at lower revs, the engines produce higher torques and horsepower on Ethanol fuel.

Voyage

Revealed in September 2008, the Voyage is the sedan variant of the current Gol and as such has the same running gear 1.0 and 1.6 liter VHT ethanol compatible engines. In several countries, the Voyage is called the Gol Sedan.

The Voyage is available in four versions on the Brazilian market; 1.0, 1.6, 1.6 Trend, and 1.6 Comfortline, all with standard with ABS brakes and dual front airbags.

The Voyage's trunk can be electronically operated via a button on the dash or by pressing the keypad; the luggage capacity is 480 liters.

Production of the sedan bodystyle ended in Brazil in 1995 and resumed in 2008, so although this is only the second generation of the Voyage, it is called the G5 in line with the equivalent Gol hatchback.

Saveiro

In August 2009, VW Brazil revealed the third generation Saveiro utility. The new Saveiro is available with a standard cabin or an extended cabin, sharing the same wheelbase which is  longer than that of the Gol and Voyage. The only available engine, the 1.6L VHT, carries over from the Gol and Voyage.

The most basic 1.6 specification has black bumpers and 14-inch steel wheels. The optional Trend package includes 14-inch alloy wheels and color-coded door handle and mirror covers; the top of the line is the Saveiro Trooper which has black-painted 15-inch steel wheels.

Engine specifications
 1.0L VHT:  ( Ethanol) producing  ( Ethanol) at 3,850 rpm
 1.0L MPI:  ( Ethanol) producing  ( Ethanol) at 3,000 rpm
 1.6L VHT:  ( Ethanol) producing  ( Ethanol) at 2,500 rpm
 1.6L MSI:  ( Ethanol) producing  ( Ethanol) at 3,000 rpm

Facelifts

The third generation of the Gol received a facelift in 2012, with more angular headlights and taillights, similar to the sixth-generation Volkswagen Jetta.

The model received another facelift in 2016, based on the fifth-generation Volkswagen Polo and the seventh-generation Volkswagen Golf. A new 1.0 liter three-cylinder was introduced, the same engine used on the Brazilian-specification Up! and Fox models, with the option of ethanol or gasoline, or a combination of both. The Rallye version based on the CrossFox with a 16-valve 1.6 liter four-cylinder was discontinued, leaving only the 8-valve 1.6 liter engine as an option to the 1.0 liter engine. The interior received a new dashboard and steering wheel similar to the Golf, with the option of a multimedia center with the navigation system, Android Auto and Apple CarPlay and MirrorLink.

 In 2018, the third generation of the Gol received the third facelift with the same front as the Gol Track. Most of the trims were discontinued, leaving only the 1.0 and 1.6, the 1.6 version is the first version available with an automatic transmission and the iMotion automated manual transmission option was removed due to reliability concerns.

In July 2018, the model received the 6-speed automatic transmission, attached to the 1.6 16v FlexFuel EA211 engine with 110/120hp.

Safety 
The Gol has been rated as highly unsafe by Latin NCAP, the 2009 model in its most basic Latin American configuration with no airbags scoring only one star for adult occupants and two stars for children. Its airbag-equipped version scored three stars. No ESP is offered, but since 2014, Brazilian law requires ABS brakes and dual front airbags in all new vehicles.

Since January 2022, the Gol is banned from sale in Argentina following the entry into force of the law prohibiting the sale of new vehicles not equipped with ESP. Volkswagen has been very critical of the new law to make this active safety equipment mandatory. By refusing to equip the Gol with ESP, Volkswagen had to stop marketing the model in Argentina, even though it was the third best-selling passenger car on the local market in 2021.

Discontinuation 
Production of the Gol ended in late 2022. A Last Edition model for the 2023 model year with exterior upgraded was released in Brazil, with production limited to 1,000 units. It will be replaced with a less equipped version of the Polo Mk6, which was introduced as the Polo Track in November 2022.

References

External links

Volkswagen Brazil official website

Gol
Subcompact cars
Latin NCAP superminis
Cars of Brazil
1990s cars
2000s cars
Cars introduced in 1980
Front-wheel-drive vehicles
Cars powered by boxer engines
Station wagons